"Love Me" is the lead single from American R&B group 112 from their second studio album, Room 112 and features vocals from rapper Mase. Q and Mike share lead vocals on the song, with Slim providing adlibs. It peaked at number 17 on the US Billboard Hot 100, and reached number eight on the Hot R&B/Hip-Hop Singles & Tracks chart. A music video directed by Frosty for the song was made, featuring the group and Mase performing in a white background. The song contains a sample of the 1981 record, "Don't You Know That?" by recording artist Luther Vandross from his debut album, Never Too Much. In the song, Mase takes a supposed shot at rapper Jay-Z on this song with the line "What we hear is platinum that, platinum this/Platinum whips, nobody got no platinum hits".

Formats and track listing 
 Australia CD single
 1. "Love Me" (Radio Mix) – 4:20
 2. "Love Me" (Instrumental) – 4:20
 3. "Only You" (Bad Boy Remix) – 4:49
 US 12" (Promo)
 A1. "Love Me" (Radio Mix) – 4:20
 A2. "Love Me" (Instrumental) – 4:20
 A3. "Love Me" (Acappella) – 4:20
 B1. "Love Me" (Radio Mix) – 4:20
 B2. "Love Me" (Instrumental) – 4:20
 B3. "Love Me" (Acappella) – 4:20
 US CD single
 1. "Love Me" (Radio Mix) – 4:20
 2. "Love Me" (Instrumental) – 4:20
 US CD single (Promo)
 1. "Love Me" (Radio Mix) – 4:20
 2. "Love Me" (Call Out Research Hook) – 0:10

Charts

Certifications

References 

1998 singles
1998 songs
112 (band) songs
Mase songs
Bad Boy Records singles
Songs written by Daron Jones
Songs written by Luther Vandross
Songs written by Slim (singer)
Songs written by Quinnes Parker
Songs written by Mase